A chemical weapon agent (CWA), or chemical warfare agent, is a chemical substance whose toxic properties are meant to kill, injure or incapacitate human beings. About 70 different chemicals have been used or stockpiled as chemical weapon agents during the 20th century. These agents may be in liquid, gas or solid form.

In general, chemical weapon agents are organized into several categories (according to the physiological manner in which they affect the human body). They may also be divided by tactical purpose or chemical structure.  The names and number of categories may vary slightly from source to source, but, in general, the different types of chemical warfare agents are listed below.

Harassing agents
These are substances that are not intended to kill or injure.  They are often referred to as Riot Control Agents (RCAs) and may be used by civilian police forces against criminals and rioters, or in the military for training purposes.  These agents also have tactical utility to force combatants out of concealed or covered positions for conventional engagement, and preventing combatants from occupying contaminated terrain or operating weapons.  In general, harassing agents are sensory irritants that have fleeting concentration dependent effects that resolve within minutes after removal.  Casualty effects are not anticipated to exceed 24-hours nor require medical attention.

Tear agents

These sensory irritants produce immediate pain to the eyes and irritate mucous membranes (aka lachrymatory agent or lachrymator).
 Benzyl chloride
 Benzyl bromide
 Bromoacetone (BA)
 Bromobenzylcyanide (CA)
 Bromomethyl ethyl ketone
 Capsaicin (OC)
 Chloracetophenone (MACE; CN)
 Chloromethyl chloroformate
 Dibenzoxazepine (CR)
 Ethyl iodoacetate
 Ortho-chlorobenzylidene malononitrile (Super tear gas; CS)
 Trichloromethyl chloroformate
 Xylyl bromide

Vomiting agents
These sensory irritants are also termed sternators or nose irritants.  They irritate the mucous membranes to produce congestion, coughing, sneezing, and eventually nausea.
 Adamsite (DM)
 Diphenylchloroarsine (DA)
 Diphenylcyanoarsine (DC)

Malodorants

These are compounds with a very strong and unpleasant smell, which produce powerfully aversive effects without the toxic effects of tear agents or vomiting agents.

Incapacitating agents
These are substances that produce debilitating effects with limited probability of permanent injury or loss of life.  The casualty effects typically last over 24 hours, and though medical evacuation and isolation is recommended, it is not required for complete recovery.  These, together with harassing agents, are sometimes called nonlethal agents.  There may be as high as 5% fatalities with the use of these agents.

Psychological agents
These are substances that produce casualty effects through mental disturbances such as delirium or hallucination.
 3-Quinuclidinyl benzilate (BZ)
 Phencyclidine (SN)
 Lysergic acid diethylamide (LSD)

Other incapacitating agents
These substances have also been investigated as incapacitants, though they operate more through interactions outside the central nervous system.
KOLOKOL-1 (tranquilizer)

Lethal agents
These substances are for producing chemical casualties without regard to long-term consequences or loss of life.  They cause injuries that require medical treatment.

Blister agents 

A blister agent is a chemical compound that irritates and causes injury to the skin.  These substances also attack the eyes, or any other tissue they contact.

Vesicants
The vesicants are substances that produce large fluid-filled blisters on the skin.

Nitrogen mustards

 Bis(2-chloroethyl)ethylamine (HN1)
 Bis(2-chloroethyl)methylamine (HN2)
 Tris(2-chloroethyl)amine (HN3)

Sulfur mustards

 1,2-Bis(2-chloroethylthio) ethane (Sesquimustard; Q)
 1,3-Bis(2-chloroethylthio)-n-propane
 1,4-Bis(2-chloroethylthio)-n-butane
 1,5-Bis(2-chloroethylthio)-n-pentane
 2-Chloroethylchloromethylsulfide
 Bis(2-chloroethyl) sulfide (Mustard gas; HD)
 Bis(2-chloroethylthio) methane
 Bis(2-chloroethylthiomethyl) ether
 Bis(2-chloroethylthioethyl) ether (O Mustard; T)

Arsenicals
 Ethyldichloroarsine (ED)
 Methyldichloroarsine (MD)
 Phenyldichloroarsine (PD)
 2-Chlorovinyldichloroarsine (Lewisite; L)

Urticants
The urticants are substances that produce a painful weal on the skin.  These are sometimes termed skin necrotizers and are known as the most painful substances produced.
Phosgene oxime (CX)

Blood agents 

These substances are metabolic poisons that interfere with the life-sustaining processes of the blood.
 Cyanogen chloride (CK)
 Hydrogen cyanide (AC)
 Arsine (SA)

Choking agents

These substances are sometime referred to as pulmonary agent or lung irritants and cause injury to the lung-blood barrier resulting in Asphyxia. 
 Chlorine (CL)
 Chloropicrin (PS)
 Diphosgene (DP)
 Phosgene (CG)

Nerve agents 

Nerve agents are substances that disrupt the chemical communications through the nervous system.  One mechanism of disruption, utilized by the G, GV, and V series of chemicals is caused by blocking the acetylcholinesterase, an enzyme that normally destroys and stops the activity of acetylcholine, a neurotransmitter. Poisoning by these nerve agents leads to an accumulation of acetylcholine at the nerve axon, producing a perpetual excited state in the nerve (e.g. constant muscle contraction). The eventual exhaustion of muscles leads to respiratory failure and death. A separate class of nerve agents are related to Tetrodotoxin, frequently abbreviated as TTX, is a potent neurotoxin with no known antidote. Tetrodotoxin blocks action potentials in nerves by binding to the voltage-gated, fast sodium channels in nerve cell membranes, essentially preventing any affected nerve cells from firing by blocking the channels used in the process.

G series
These are high volatility nerve agents that are typically used for a nonpersistent to semipersistent effect.
 Tabun (GA)
 Sarin (GB)
 Soman (GD)
 Cyclosarin (GF)

GV series
These agents have a volatility between the V and G agents and are typically used for a semi-persistent to persistent effect. 
 Novichok agents
GV (nerve agent)

V series
These agents have low volatility and are typically used for a persistent effect or liquid contact hazard.
 VE
 VG
 VM
 VX

T series
These agents are related to the puffer fish 
 Tetrodotoxin
 Saxitoxin (TZ)

Other
 Botulinum toxin

Chemical weapons